The South Dakota National Guard is part of the South Dakota Department of Military & Veterans Affairs. It was created in 1862 as the State Militia. Its headquarters is located in Rapid City, South Dakota.
It consists of the South Dakota Army National Guard and the South Dakota Air National Guard.

The Guard in South Dakota was first activated 1862 by the territorial governor, and consisted of six companies of militia, composed of cavalry and infantry. In April 1898 the first infantry was federalized and deployed to the Philippines.

South Dakota Army National Guard
The South Dakota Army National Guard maintains and operates 24 armories, and in 22 different communities. Major components of the SD ARNG include field artillery, engineer, transportation, aviation, maintenance and medical units.

Major units:
 Joint Force Headquarters
  196th Maneuver Enhancement Brigade
 109th Engineer Battalion
 153d Engineer Battalion
 1st Battalion, 147th Field Artillery Regiment (MLRS)
 Battery A
 Battery B
 Forward Support Company
 139th Brigade Support Battalion
 109th Regional Support Group
 152d Combat Sustainment Support Battalion
 665th Maintenance Company (Surface)
 730th Medical Company (Area Support)
 740th Transportation Company
 1742d Transportation Company
 881st Troop Command
 235th Military Police Company
 147th Army Band
 Detachment 1, Company B, 1st Battalion, 112th Aviation Regiment
 Company C, 1st Battalion, 189th Aviation Regiment
 Detachment 2, Company D, 1st Battalion, 189th Aviation Regiment
 Detachment 2, Company E, 1st Battalion, 189th Aviation Regiment
 Detachment 5, Company C, 2d Battalion, 641st Aviation Regiment
 Detachment 1, Company B, 935th Aviation Support Battalion (mobilizes with the Combat Aviation Brigade, 35th Infantry Division)
 Detachment 48, Operational Support Airlift Command
 129th Mobile Public Affairs Detachment
  196th Regiment (Regional Training Institute)

History

The South Dakota National Guard traces its history to the establishment of the Dakota Territory on March 2, 1861. Just prior to the establishment of the territory, in the 1850s, the U.S. Army had established garrisons at Fort Pierre and Fort Randall on the Missouri River. The U.S. Army detachments had been deployed to protect the settlers in Dakota from Native American tribes, but when the Civil War started, the U.S. Army withdrew most of its forces to put down the Confederate States of America. Because of this, the Territorial Governor William Jayne raised two companies of volunteer militia in December 1861, which were the predecessors of the South Dakota National Guard.

Since that historic date in 1862, the SDNG has seen combat during the Spanish-American War, World War I and II, Operation Just Cause and Operation Desert Storm. The National Guard was also called up during the Mexican Border Conflict, Korean War, Berlin Crisis and peacekeeping missions in Bosnia and Kosovo.

Historical units
  147th Field Artillery Regiment 
 132d Engineer Battalion
 109th Engineer Regiment

In Jan. 2013, Charmaine White Face raised concerns about radiation exposure of South Dakota Army National Guard soldiers in the Buffalo Gap National Grassland.

South Dakota Air National Guard
South Dakota Air National Guard
 114th Fighter Wing

Use of private funding for deployment 
In June 2021, the governor announced the deployment of up to 50 National Guard troops to the southern U.S. border to be funded by a private donor. The announcement was characterized as "unprecedented and unethical" by military and oversight experts.

See also
South Dakota State Guard

References

External links 
 South Dakota National Guard
 Globalsecurity.org, South Dakota National Guard
Bibliography of South Dakota Army National Guard History compiled by the United States Army Center of Military History

National Guard (United States)
Military in South Dakota
1862 establishments in Dakota Territory